Carlos Roberto Massa (born 15 February 1956), better known as Ratinho, is a Brazilian television presenter, businessman, comedian, radio personality, and politician.

Biography
Ratinho was a politician from the late 1970s until the mid-1990s, where he was the Vereador of Curitiba and then Federal Deputy for Paraná where he ran for the Partido da Reconstrução Nacional party. He is the founder and owner of Grupo Massa, which operates in communications, agribusiness, management and brand licensing.

Ratinho began his television career in 1991 as a police reporter on Rede OM. In 1997, he debuted a program called Ratinho Livre. In 1998 he transferred to SBT and hosted the show Programa do Ratinho, which ran until 2006. The show returned in 2009 and he returned to host.

Personal life
Ratinho's son, Ratinho Júnior is the current governor of the state of Paraná, having won the 2018 election. He is a supporter of the Brazilian football club Palmeiras. He is a staunch supporter of Jair Bolsonaro.

Ratinho became a friend and business partner of singer and digital influencer Metturo and shares events together.

References

1956 births
Living people
People from São Paulo (state)
Brazilian television presenters
Members of the Chamber of Deputies (Brazil) from Paraná
Brazilian Democratic Movement politicians
Brazilian Labour Party (current) politicians